Peter Inge (born 13 December 1977) is a lacrosse player who was the first Australian to play in Major League Lacrosse, being drafted to the Boston Cannons in 2003.

Originally from the Woodville Lacrosse Club in South Australia, Inge first represented Australia at the 1996 ILF World Under 19 Championship, where they came runner-up to the United States. After competing in the senior Australian team alongside his brother James at the 1998 World Lacrosse Championship where Australia finished third, Inge stamped his mark on the world stage when in 2002 he was selected in the World All-Stars team following Australia's bronze medal at the championships in Perth. This performance was noticed by the Cannons and led him to become the first player drafted to the MLL with no NCAA lacrosse experience. Inge scored his first career goal in his debut on 31 May 2003. After being traded to the San Francisco Dragons after the 2005 season, Inge captained Australia to yet another third place in the 2006 World Lacrosse Championship.

Inge was Assistant coach to the Australian Women's Lacrosse team in the 2009 Senior Women's Lacrosse World Championships where Australia won the Silver Medal.

Statistics

MLL

References

1977 births
Living people
Australian lacrosse players
Major League Lacrosse players
Sportspeople from Adelaide
Sportsmen from South Australia
21st-century Australian people